Cross-linking and immunoprecipitation (CLIP, or CLIP-seq) is a method used in molecular biology that combines UV crosslinking with immunoprecipitation in order to identify RNA binding sites of proteins on a transcriptome-wide scale, thereby increasing our understanding of post-transcriptional regulatory networks. CLIP can be used either with antibodies against endogenous proteins, or with common peptide tags (including FLAG, V5, HA, and others) or affinity purification, which enables the possibility of profiling model organisms or RBPs otherwise lacking suitable antibodies.

Workflow

CLIP begins with the in-vivo cross-linking of RNA-protein complexes using ultraviolet light (UV). Upon UV exposure, covalent bonds are formed between proteins and nucleic acids that are in close proximity (on the order of Angstroms apart). The cross-linked cells are then lysed, RNA is fragmented, and the protein of interest is isolated via immunoprecipitation. In order to allow for priming of reverse transcription, RNA adapters are ligated to the 3' ends, and RNA fragments are labelled to enable the analysis of the RNA-protein complexes after they have been separated from free RNA using gel electrophoresis and membrane transfer. Proteinase K digestion is then performed in order to remove protein from the crosslinked RNA, which leaves a few amino acids at the crosslink site. This often leads to truncation of cDNAs at the crosslinked nucleotide, which is exploited in variants such as iCLIP to increase the resolution of the method. cDNA is then synthesized via RT-PCR followed by high-throughput sequencing followed by mapping the reads back to the transcriptome and other computational analyses to study the interaction sites.

History and applications
CLIP was originally undertaken to study interactions between the neuron-specific RNA-binding protein and splicing factors NOVA1 and NOVA2 in the mouse brain, identifying RNA binding sites that contained the expected Nova-binding motifs. Sequencing of the cDNA library identified many positions  close to alternative exons, several of which were found to require Nova1/2 for their brains-specific splicing patterns. In 2008, CLIP was combined with high-throughput sequencing (termed "HITS-CLIP") to generate genome-wide protein-RNA interaction maps for Nova; since then a number of other RNA-binding proteins have been studied with CLIP, including PTBP1, RbFox2 (where the was referred to as "CLIP-seq"), SFRS1, Argonaute, hnRNP C, the Fragile-X mental retardation protein FMRP, Ptbp2 (in the mouse brain), Mbnl2, the nElavl proteins (the neuron-specific Hu proteins), and has been applied to RNA binding proteins from all kingdoms of life, including prokaryotes. CLIP analysis of the RNA-binding protein Argonaute led to identification of microRNA targets by decoding microRNA-mRNA and protein-RNA interaction maps in the mouse brain and subsequently in budding yeast (Saccharomyces cerevisiae), Caenorhabditis elegans, embryonic stem cells and tissue culture cells.

Methods

HITS-CLIP

HITS-CLIP combines UV cross-linking and immunoprecipitation with high-throughput sequencing to identify binding sites of RNA-binding proteins. HITS-CLIP also introduced the addition of dinucleotide barcodes to primers, provindg the ability to sequence and then deconvolute multiple experiments simultaneously. With analysis of cross-linking induced mutation sites (CIMS) at high sequencing depths, crosslink sites can be differentiated from other sources of sequence variation.

PAR-CLIP

PAR-CLIP (photoactivatable ribonucleoside–enhanced cross-linking and immunoprecipitation) is also used for identifying the binding sites of cellular RNA-binding proteins (RBPs) and microRNA-containing ribonucleoprotein complexes (miRNPs). The method relies on the incorporation of photoreactive ribonucleoside analogs, such as 4-thiouridine (4-SU) and 6-thioguanosine (6-SG) into nascent RNA transcripts by living cells. Irradiation of the cells by UV light of 365 nm induces efficient cross-linking of photoreactive nucleoside-labeled cellular RNAs to interacting RBPs. Immunoprecipitation of the RBP of interest is followed by the isolation of the cross-linked and co-immunoprecipitated RNA. The isolated RNA is converted into a cDNA library and deep sequenced using high-throughput sequencing technology. Cross-linking the 4-SU and 6-SG analogs results in thymidine to cytidine, and guanosine to adenosine transitions respectively. As a result, PAR-CLIP can identify binding site locations with high accuracy.

However, PAR-CLIP is limited mainly to cultured cells, and nucleoside cytotoxicity is a concern; it has been reported that 4-SU inhibits ribosomal RNA synthesis, induces a nucleolar stress response, and reduces cell proliferation. PAR-CLIP has been employed to determine the transcriptome-wide binding sites of several known RBPs and microRNA-containing ribonucleoprotein complexes at high resolution. This includes the miRNA targeting AGO and TNRC6 proteins.

iCLIP

iCLIP (individual nucleotide–resolution crosslinking and immunoprecipitation) is a variant of CLIP that enabled amplification of truncated cDNAs, which are produced when reverse transcription stops prematurely at the cross-link site. Other approaches to identify protein-RNA crosslink sites include mutational analysis of read-through cDNAs, such as nucleotide transitions in PAR-CLIP, or rare errors introduced by reverse transcriptase when it reads through the crosslink sites in standard HITS-CLIP methods, termed Crosslink induced mutation site (CIMS) analysis.

iCLIP also added a random sequence (unique molecular identifier, UMI) along with experimental barcodes to the primer used for reverse transcription, thereby barcoding unique cDNAs to minimise any errors or quantitative biases of PCR, and thus improving the quantification of binding events. Enabling amplification of truncated cDNAs led to identification of the sites of RNA-protein interactions at high resolution by analysing the starting position of truncated cDNAs, as well as their precise quantification using UMIs with software called "iCount". These innovations of iCLIP were adopted by later variants of CLIP such as eCLIP and irCLIP. Another modification of iCLIP, miCLIP, identifies methylated RNA sites with use of mutant enzyme or modification-specific antibody. The quantitative nature of iCLIP enabled  comparison across samples at the level of full RNAs, or to study competitive binding of multiple RNA-binding proteins or subtle changes in binding of a mutant protein at the level of binding peaks.

eCLIP

eCLIP (enhanced CrossLinking and ImmunoPrecipitation followed by high-throughput sequencing) is also used to map RBP binding sites on RNAs transcriptome-wide. eCLIP was designed to improve upon iCLIP by increasing the efficiency in converting purified RNA fragments into cDNA library. At its publication, eCLIP was reported to increase such efficiency by >1000-fold, which not only decreases wasted sequencing of PCR duplicate molecules, but also dramatically decreases experimental failures during the CLIP procedure. Additionally, the amplification in eCLIP is now comparable to RNA-seq, enabling rigorous quantitative normalization against paired input controls (to remove background at ribosomal and other highly abundant RNAs) as well as quantitative comparison across peaks and samples, enabling the ability to detect allele-specific binding or differential RNA binding between conditions.As in other CLIP methods, eCLIP relies on RBP-RNA interactions covalently linked using UV crosslinking of live cells. Cells are then lysed, and RNA is fragmented using limited RNase treatment. A specific RBP (and its bound RNA) is then immunoprecipitated using an antibody that specifically recognizes the targeted RBP. After ligation of a 3’ RNA adapter, immunoprecipitated material (as well as a paired input sample) are run on denaturing protein gels and transferred to nitrocellulose membranes. A region from the protein size to 75 kDa above is cut from the membrane and treated with Proteinase K to release RNA. After cleanup, RNA is then reverse transcribed to ssDNA, when a second adapter is ligated. By ligating the second adapter to cDNAs, eCLIP can identify truncated cDNAs, similar to iCLIP, and thereby study RNA-protein interaction sites with high resolution. PCR amplification is then used to obtain sufficient material for high-throughput sequencing. eCLIP can also be used to identify miRNA targets and profile RNA modifications such as m6A.eCLIP datasets have been produced for over 150 RBPs with validated commercially available antibodies.

Other CLIP methods

sCLIP (simple CLIP) is a technique that requires lower amounts of input RNA and omits radio-labeling of the immunoprecipitated RNA. The method is based on linear amplification of the immunoprecipitated RNA and thereby improves the complexity of the sequencing-library despite significantly reducing the amount of input material and omitting several purification steps. Additionally, it permits a radiolabel-free visualization of immunoprecipitated RNA by using a highly sensitive biotin-based labeling technique. Along with a bioinformatical platform this method is designed to provide deep insights into RNA–protein interactomes in biomedical science, where the amount of starting material is often limited (i.e. in case of precious clinical samples).

As a modification of CLIP, methylated RNA sites were identified with the use of mutant enzyme or modification-specific antibody with the methods termed miCLIP or m6A-CLIP.

Advantages and limitations

Advantages
RNA-binding proteins are frequently components of multi-protein complexes, and RNAs from various genes are present in cells at a range of abundance, therefore it is common that RNAs bound to co-purified proteins or non-specifically sticking to beads may be isolated when immunoprecipitating a specific protein. The data specificity obtained using early immunoprecipitation methods such as RIP have been demonstrated to be dependent on the reaction conditions of the experiment, such as protein concentrations and ionic conditions, and reassociation of RNA-binding proteins following cell lysis could lead to detection of artificial interactions. Formaldehyde crosslinking methods have been used to preserve RNA-protein interactions, but these also generate protein-protein cross-links. By employing UV crosslinking that is specific to direct protein-RNA contacts, CLIP avoid protein-protein cross-links and ensures high specificity, while also obtaining positional information on the sites of protein-RNA interactions.

Since UV crosslinking creates a covalent bond, the crosslinked RNA fragments retain a short peptide after Proteinase K digestion, which can be exploited to identify the crosslink site. Reverse transcription most often truncates at the crosslink sites, creating truncated cDNAs that are exploited by iCLIP, while read-through cDNAs often contain mutations at the crosslink site (see HITS-CLIP and PAR-CLIP).

Limitations

All CLIP library generation protocols require moderate quantities of cells or tissue (50–100 mg), require numerous enzymatic steps, and customised computational analyses. Certain steps are difficult to optimize and frequently have low efficiencies. For example, overdigestion with RNase can decrease the number of identified binding sites and thus needs to be optimised. Crosslinking efficiency also varies between proteins, and nucleotide bias of crosslinking has been reported, for example by comparing cross-linking sites and motifs enriched when protein-RNA complexes are studied in vivo in living cells and in vitro, though methods are being developed to minimise such bias for enriched motif discovery. Computationally predicted miRNA targets derived from TargetScan are comparable to CLIP in identifying miRNA targets, raising questions as to its utility relative to existing predictions. Because CLIP methods rely on immunoprecipitation, crosslinked RNA could in some cases affect antibody-epitope interactions. Finally, significant differences have been observedTherefore, raw CLIP results require further computational analyses to thoroughly investigate RNA-protein binding site interactions within the cell.

Similar methods
RIP-Chip studies enrichment of full RNAs after immunoprecipitation of specific protein followed by microarray analysis, but without using cross-linking, it does not identify RNA binding sites
ChIP-Seq, method for finding interactions with DNA rather than RNA
SELEX, an n vitro method for finding a consensus binding sequence

Further reading

 starBase database: a database for exploring miRNA-lncRNA, miRNA-mRNA, miRNA-sncRNA, miRNA-circRNA, protein-lncRNA, protein-RNA interactions and ceRNA networks from PAR-CLIP(CLIP-Seq, HITS-CLIP, iCLIP, CLASH) data, and TargetScan, PicTar, RNA22, miRanda and PITA microRNA target sites.
 BIMSB doRiNA database: a database for exploring protein-RNA and microRNA-target interactions from CLIP-Seq, HITS-CLIP, PAR-CLIP, iCLIP data and PICTAR microRNA target site predictions.
 miRTarCLIP: A computational approach for identifying microRNA-target interactions using high-throughput CLIP and PAR-CLIP sequencing.
 clipz: a pipeline to analyze short RNA reads from HITS-CLIP experiments.
 dCLIP: dCLIP is a Perl program for discovering differential binding regions in two comparative CLIP-Seq (HITS-CLIP, PAR-CLIP or iCLIP) experiments.

References

Sources

 
 
 
 
 
 
 
 
 
 
 
 
 
 
 
 
  
 
 
 
 
 
 
 
 
 
 
 
 
 
 
 
 
 
 

 

Genetics techniques
RNA